The discography of American metalcore band As I Lay Dying consists of 7 studio albums, 2 compilation albums, 1 video album, 12 singles and 20 corresponding music videos as well as 1 split album with fellow metalcore band American Tragedy called As I Lay Dying/American Tragedy.

Studio albums

Compilation albums

Video albums

Split albums

Music videos

References

External links
 Official site

Discographies of American artists
Heavy metal group discographies